Big Blue River Bridge may refer to:

 Big Blue River Bridge (Grafton, Nebraska), listed on the National Register of Historic Places in Fillmore County, Nebraska
 Big Blue River Bridge (Surprise, Nebraska), listed on the National Register of Historic Places in Butler County, Nebraska

See also
Big Blue River (disambiguation)